Riolo Terme ( or ) is a comune (municipality) in the Province of Ravenna in the Italian region Emilia-Romagna, located about  southeast of Bologna and about  southwest of Ravenna. The main attraction of the town are the termal baths.

History
Until 1957, the town was known as Riolo dei Bagni (Riolo of the Baths).

Geography
Riolo Terme borders the following municipalities: Borgo Tossignano, Brisighella, Casola Valsenio, Castel Bolognese, Faenza and Imola. It counts 5 hamlets (frazioni): Borgo Rivola, Cuffiano, Isola, Mazzolano and Torranello.

Demographics

Twin towns
Riolo Terme is twinned with:

  Oberasbach, Germany

References

External links

 Riolo Terme official website

Cities and towns in Emilia-Romagna
Spa towns in Italy